A pocket cruiser is a sailboat designed for recreational cruising and club racing, under   in length.

Like the similar and usually smaller trailer sailer they have design features to make it possible to tow them with passenger vehicles, such as light weight, and short ballasted retractable shoal draft keels.

Being cruisers, they also include amenities that provide the comfort of larger boats, such as a cabin, with berths, a galley, a head, and cockpit.

Properly equipped, these style boats are capable of long offshore passages, as proven by circumnavigators Eric and Susan Hiscock, Lin and Larry Pardey, and Tania Aebi, among others.

The term was coined in the 1970s as fiberglass sailing yacht building took off.

See also
Day sailer

Notes

Sailboat types